John A. Russo (born February 2, 1939), sometimes credited as Jack Russo or John Russo, is an American screenwriter and film director most commonly associated with the 1968 horror classic film Night of the Living Dead, which he co-wrote with director George Romero. As a screenwriter, his credits include Night of the Living Dead, The Majorettes, Midnight, and Santa Claws. The latter two, he also directed. He has performed small roles as an actor, most notably the first ghoul who is stabbed in the head in Night of the Living Dead, as well as cameos in There's Always Vanilla and House of Frankenstein 1997. He was the Publisher and Managing Editor of the magazine Scream Queens Illustrated that featured popular stars of Horror films and other genres.

Career
Russo attended West Virginia University while his friend Rudy Ricci attended Carnegie Mellon University in Pittsburgh. Ricci met George A. Romero at Carnegie Mellon and introduced Russo to Romero on Russo's Christmas vacation. After college, Russo was drafted into the army and served a two-year stint. Meanwhile, Romero with Russell Streiner formed The Latent Image to produce commercial films with the aim of eventually making a full-length feature film. When Russo got out of the army, he joined his friends in The Latent Image and soon plans were made for a feature film. Russo crafted a rough idea about a young man stumbling upon a host of ghouls feeding off human corpses. Romero loved the idea and a few days later he presented Russo with forty pages of a story based on the idea. The film ultimately became Night of the Living Dead which led to Romero's Dead series and the Living Dead series, with the latter based on a story by Russo.

Russo went on to author many novels and, like his friend Romero, began making films of his own. The Booby Hatch was a sex comedy released in 1976. Midnight was an adaptation of Russo's novel of the same name and released in 1982. His novel The Majorettes was adapted by Russo himself and directed by Bill Hinzman who played the Cemetery Zombie in Night of the Living Dead. Russo's next film was Heartstopper which featured "name" actors Michael J. Pollard and Moon Unit Zappa. Russo considers it his favorite of the films he has directed.

Russo is also the founder and one of the co-mentors (along with Russell Streiner) of the John Russo Movie Making Program at DuBois Business College in DuBois, Pennsylvania.

Russo was born and grew up in Clarion, Pennsylvania and lives in Glassport, Pennsylvania.

Filmography

As an actor 
My Uncle John is a Zombie (2016) .... Uncle John
House of Frankenstein 1997 (1997) (miniseries) .... Honor Guard
Santa Claws (1996) (as John Russo) .... Detective
a.k.a.  'Tis the Season
The Inheritor (1990) .... Unknown role
The Majorettes (1986) (as John Russo) .... Dr. Gibson the Coroner
a.k.a. One by One
There's Always Vanilla (1971) (uncredited) .... Music producer
a.k.a. The Affair
Night of the Living Dead (1968) (uncredited) .... Washington military reporter/Ghoul in house

Documentary appearances 
 More Brains! A Return to the Living Dead (2011)...Himself
  One for the Fire: The Legacy of Night of the Living Dead  (2008)...Himself (also served as associate producer)
UnConventional (2004) .... Himself
The Dead Walk: Remaking a Classic (1999) (V) .... Himself
Note: this is a "making-of" special featured on the DVD edition of the 1990 remake of Night of the Living Dead.
A-Z of Horror (1997) (mini) TV Series .... Himself
a.k.a. Clive Barker's A-Z of Horror (UK: complete title)
Night of the Living Dead: 25th Anniversary Documentary (1993) (V) .... Himself
Note: this is a 25th Anniversary special featured on a video release of the original Night of the Living Dead film.
 Horror F/X (1989) (V) .... Himself
Note: Russo interviews frequent collaborator and fellow Pittsburgh horror movie maker, Tom Savini, in this low-budget shot-on-video documentary.
Drive-In Madness! (1987) .... Himself
a.k.a. Screen Scaries (USA: video title)

Bibliography
 Night of the Living Dead (1974) [Warner paperback Library] 
 Return of the Living Dead (1977) [Dale] 
 Majorettes (1979) [Pocket books] 
 Midnight (1980) [Pocket books]  
 Limb to Limb (1981) [Pocket Books] 
 Bloodsisters (1982) [Pocket Books] 
 Black Cat (1982) [Pocket Books] 
 The Awakening (1983) [Pocket Books] 
 Day Care (1985) [Pocket Books] 
 Return of the Living Dead (1985) -Novelization Version- [Arrow Books] 
 Inhuman [1986] [Pocket Books] 
 Voodoo Dawn (1987) [Imagine]
 Living Things (1988) [Popular Library] 
 The Complete Night of the Living Dead Film Book (1989) [Random House]
 Making Movies (1989) [Dell] 
 Scare Tactics (1992) [Dell] 
 How to Make Your Own Feature Movie for $10,000 or Less (1995) [Zinn P.G.] 
 Hell's Creation (1995) (Ravenmor) 
 The Sanity Ward (1995) (Ravenmor) 
 Undead (2010) (Kensington)  (Omnibus of Night of the Living Dead and Return of the Living Dead)
 The Big Book of Bizarro (2011) (Burning Bulb Publishing)  (Contains the short story Channel 666)
 The Hungry Dead (2013) (Kensington)  (Contains the novel Escape of the Living Dead and the 1980 novel Midnight)
 Dealey Plaza (2014) (Burning Bulb Publishing) 
 Epidemic of the Living Dead (2018) (Kensington) 
 Spawn of the Living Dead (2019) (CreateSpace Independent Publishing Platform) 
 The Darkest Web (2022) (Wolfpack Publishing LLC) 
 The Night They Came Home (2022) (Wolfpack Publishing LLC) 
 The Unearthly (2022) (Wolfpack Publishing LLC)
 Weep No More (2022) (Wolfpack Publishing LLC)
 The Killing Truth (2022) (Wolfpack Publishing LLC)
 The Price of Admission (2022) (Wolfpack Publishing LLC)

Comics
With Avatar Press he is writing a number of comic books:

Escape of the Living Dead
George A. Romero's Night of the Living Dead
Plague of the Living Dead

References

Bibliography

External links

John Russo Movie Making Program at DuBois Business College
 
 

1939 births
American film directors
Place of birth missing (living people)
American male screenwriters
Living people